Zbigniew Schwarzer (12 January 1928 – 14 April 2008) was a Polish rower. He competed at the 1952 Summer Olympics and the 1956 Summer Olympics.

References

1928 births
2008 deaths
Polish male rowers
Olympic rowers of Poland
Rowers at the 1952 Summer Olympics
Rowers at the 1956 Summer Olympics
Sportspeople from Poznań